August "Guus" Scheffer (24 November 1898 – 1 November 1952) was a Dutch weightlifter. He competed at the 1924 and 1928 Summer Olympics in the lightweight and middleweight categories and finished in seventh and third place, respectively.

References

1898 births
1952 deaths
Dutch male weightlifters
Olympic weightlifters of the Netherlands
Weightlifters at the 1924 Summer Olympics
Weightlifters at the 1928 Summer Olympics
Olympic bronze medalists for the Netherlands
Sportspeople from Haarlem
Olympic medalists in weightlifting
Medalists at the 1928 Summer Olympics
19th-century Dutch people
20th-century Dutch people